Sandra Elisabet Eriksson (born 4 June 1989, in Nykarleby) is a Finnish middle distance runner, who specializes mainly in the 3000 metres steeplechase. Her personal best is 9:24.70, achieved in July 2014 in Glasgow. This is the current national record.

She competed in 2007 European Junior Championships (10th) and in 2008 World Junior Championships (5th). She competed at the World Championships in 2009 and 2011 without reaching the final.

She competed in the 2016 Summer Olympics.

Achievements

References

External links
Sandra Eriksson's profile in Tilastopaja 

1989 births
Living people
Finnish female middle-distance runners
Finnish female steeplechase runners
People from Nykarleby
Swedish-speaking Finns
Athletes (track and field) at the 2012 Summer Olympics
Olympic athletes of Finland
World Athletics Championships athletes for Finland
Athletes (track and field) at the 2016 Summer Olympics
Sportspeople from Ostrobothnia (region)
20th-century Finnish women
21st-century Finnish women
Universiade medalists in athletics (track and field)
Universiade bronze medalists for Finland